Nova (Sam Alexander) is a superhero appearing in American comic books published by Marvel Comics. The character, a space-faring member of the intergalactic police force known as the Nova Corps, was created in 2011 by writer Jeph Loeb and artist Ed McGuinness, based on the original Nova Richard Rider.

Publication history
Sam Alexander first appeared in Marvel Point One #1 (November 2011), created by writer Jeph Loeb and artist Ed McGuinness. The character was named after Loeb's son, who died after a three-year battle with bone cancer at the age of 17.

The Sam Alexander version of the character first appeared in the Marvel Point One one-shot in November 2011 before starring in his own series beginning in February 2013

Fictional character biography
Sam Alexander is a sixteen-year-old living in Carefree, Arizona, with his father, mother, and little sister. His father is always drunk and often talks about his supposed life as a Nova Centurion, and shirks his duties as a janitor at his son's school. Sam's mother is a Latina homemaker. When Sam comes home from school to find his father missing, Sam accidentally injures himself and wakes up in a hospital. There, Rocket Raccoon and Gamora reveal Sam's father really was in the Nova Corps. After putting on his father's helmet, Sam travels to the moon, meeting Uatu the Watcher, who reveals an invasion fleet of alien ships belonging to the Chitauri. Upon returning to Earth, Rocket Raccoon and Gamora train him and tell him to scout the fleet.

Sometime later, Sam is on a mission to warn planets in its path that Dark Phoenix is coming for them. He crashes on Earth, but is able to deliver the warning to the Avengers. After recovering, Nova joins the Avengers and the X-Men against Cyclops, who has become the new Dark Phoenix after Jean. Thor asks Sam to join the Avengers, and Sam eventually accepts. Afterwards, he encounters the previous Nova's recurring enemy Diamondhead, but easily defeats him.

During the events of "Infinity", Sam learns from his crush, Carrie, that she knows he is Nova. Shocked, he flies into the sky, but accidentally removes his helmet and lands in a coma. He wakes up to Justice and Speedball, who offer him a spot on the New Warriors. He next faces off against Kaldera, an agent of Proxima Midnight and defeats her in combat. Sam becomes cocky and prideful and begins to feel above the New Warriors and disregard his mother's rules. He gets into an argument with Carrie and gets mad at Justice and Speedball. He eventually speaks to Uatu who gives Sam some advice and he returns to Earth to agree to his mother's rules and joins the New Warriors.

During a day of training with Uatu at the Watcher's moon base at the start of the "Original Sin" storyline, Uatu reveals that Sam's father Jesse Alexander is alive. Sam leaves where he is happy with the information he just learned.

Following the Civil War II storyline, Sam leaves the Avengers to join the Champions. The team heads to Lasibad, Sharzad to rescue a group of women and girls being attacked by terrorists.

Powers and abilities
Sam Alexander wears a helmet that gives him access to the Nova Force, which grants him superhuman strength and durability, flight, energy projection, telekinesis, force fields, universal translation and the ability to breathe underwater and survive in space.

Reception

Accolades 

 In 2017, Den of Geek ranked Nova 2nd in their "Guardians of the Galaxy 3: 50 Marvel Characters We Want to See" list.
 In 2018, CBR.com ranked Nova 8th in their "Marvel's Strongest Cosmic Heroes" list.
 In 2021, Screen Rant ranked Nova 3rd in their "10 Most Powerful Members Of The Champions" list.

Literary reception

Volumes

Nova - 2013 
According to Diamond Comic Distributors, Nova #1 was the 14th best selling comic book in February 2013.

Tony Guerrero of Comic Vine gave Nova #1 a grade of 4 out of 5 stars, saying, "As a Richard Rider fan, I wasn't thrilled over the idea of a series starring a different Nova. Jeph Loeb does a good job in introducing who the character is and where he comes from. The version of Sam Alexander here is thankfully different than what is seen on the animated Ultimate Spider-Man series. As a first issue, we get the basics, we are introduced to Sam and get an idea how he becomes Nova. What we dont know is if the series will be based in space, on Earth or both. Ed McGuinness' art is great as he always manages to capture and depict big action scenes. We're off to a great start. I was hesitant about actually liking a Nova series with a different Nova but I have to admit I'm hooked so far." Benjamin Bailey of IGN gave Nova #1 a grade of 7.6 out of 10, writing, "If it's a fresh, new tale you are looking for, Nova probably isn't for you. You've read this comic before, no doubt. That said, if you just want a fun, classic-feeling adventure, then go ahead and give this series a shot. Sure, it copies countless other stories, but it copies them very well and with a bit of its own style and flair."

Nova - 2015 
According to Diamond Comic Distributors, Nova #1 was the 47th best selling comic book in November 2015.

Alexander Jones of ComicsBeat wrote, "Sean Ryan’s depiction of Sam Alexander has compelled me to keep reading this series. I love that the book has a sentimental value owed to Jeph Loeb’s son Sam, and I love that Marvel has such a young hero. The art direction actually fits better for this series than I first realized. Verdict: This is a strong first showing. I’m happy to read what’s next."

Nova - 2016 
According to Diamond Comic Distributors, Nova #1 was the 30th best selling comic book in December 2016.

Tony Guerrero of Comic Vine gave Nova #1 a grade of 4 out of 5 stars, writing, "What could be better than a comic series with Nova? How about a comic series with two Novas? New and old fans can rejoice as the adventures of Sam Alexander continue along side the return another character. Jeff Loveness and Ramon Perez are giving the two characters clear and distinct voices. The art and color creates a good atmosphere and tone for the characters. With the questions raised here, there's definitely plenty of reasons to come back for more."

In other media

Television
 Sam Alexander / Nova appears in Ultimate Spider-Man, voiced by Logan Miller. This version has no family and is the last of the Nova Corps after former member Titus killed them to claim another helmet. Alexander was taken in by the Guardians of the Galaxy and trained by Rocket Raccoon before leaving the team for Earth to become a S.H.I.E.L.D. trainee. Throughout seasons one and two, Alexander serves as a rival to fellow trainee Spider-Man. In season three, the former becomes Nova Prime while fighting Titus and the Chitauri. In season four, he leaves the team to help Nick Fury protect Madame Web before returning in the two-part series finale "Graduation Day" for the eponymous ceremony.
 Sam Alexander / Nova appears in Marvel Disk Wars: The Avengers, voiced by Suganuma Hisayoshi in the Japanese version and by Sam Riegel in the English version.
 Sam Alexander appears in Guardians of the Galaxy, voiced again by Logan Miller. This version learned of the Nova Corps from his father, Jesse Alexander, before the latter went missing.

Video games
 The Ultimate Spider-Man incarnation of Sam Alexander / Nova appears as a downloadable alternative costume for Richard Rider / Nova in Ultimate Marvel vs. Capcom 3.
 Sam Alexander / Nova's outfit appears in LittleBigPlanet as part of the "Marvel Costume Kit 5" DLC.
 Sam Alexander / Nova appears as a playable character in Marvel Heroes, voiced again by Logan Miller.
 Sam Alexander / Nova appears as a playable character in Lego Marvel Super Heroes. 
 Sam Alexander / Nova appears in Disney Infinity 2.0, as part of the Spider-Man Playset Pack, and Disney Infinity 3.0.
 Sam Alexander / Nova appears as a playable character in Marvel: Avengers Alliance.
 Sam Alexander / Nova appears as a playable character in Marvel Puzzle Quest.
Sam Alexander / Nova appears as a playable character in Lego Marvel's Avengers.
 Sam Alexander / Nova appears as a playable character in Marvel: Future Fight.
 Sam Alexander / Nova appears as a playable character in Lego Marvel Super Heroes 2, as part of the Champions DLC.

Toys
 Sam Alexander / Nova appears in the LEGO Marvel Super Heroes set, 76005 Spider-Man: Daily Bugle Showdown, with his appearance based on the Ultimate Spider-Man TV series version.
 In 2013, Sam Alexander / Nova was available in the Ultimate Spider-Man 6-inch toyline.
 Sam Alexander / Nova is available for the Disney Infinity 2.0 video game as a figure and playable character.
 In 2017, Sam Alexander / Nova appeared as part of Hasbro's Marvel Legends toyline.

Books
In the children's book Spider-Man: Attack of the Heroes, Nova is among the heroes replaced by the Chameleon in an attempt to frame him as a supervillain. However, Nova is later freed by Spider-Man.

Collected editions 
 Nova Vol. 1: Origin (collects Nova Vol 5 #1-5, Point One #1 (Nova story), Marvel Now! Point One #1 (Nova story)) September 2013, 
 Nova Vol. 2: Rookie Season (collects Nova Vol 5 #6-9, #10 (A story)) March 2014, 
 Nova Vol. 3: Nova Corpse (collects Nova Vol 5 #10 (B story), #11-16) June 2014, 
 Nova Vol. 4: Original Sin (collects Nova Vol 5 #17-22) January 2015, 
 Nova Vol. 5: Axis (collects Nova Vol 5 #23-27) April 2015, 
 Nova Vol. 6: Homecoming (collects Nova Vol 5 #28-31, Annual #1) November 2015, 
 Nova The Human Rocket Vol. 1: Burn Out (collects Nova Vol 6 #1-6) June 2016, 
 Nova The Human Rocket Vol. 2: Afterburn (collects Nova Vol 6 #7-11) January 2017, 
 Nova: Resurrection (collects Nova Vol 7 #1-7) August 2017,

References

2013 comics debuts
Avengers (comics) characters
Characters created by Jeph Loeb
Comics characters introduced in 2011
Fictional extraterrestrial–human hybrids in comics
Fictional characters from Arizona
Guardians of the Galaxy characters
Marvel Comics hybrids
Marvel Comics characters who can move at superhuman speeds
Marvel Comics characters with superhuman strength
Marvel Comics male superheroes
S.H.I.E.L.D. agents
Mexican superheroes
Marvel Comics child superheroes
Teenage superheroes